Anna Kalinskaya was the defending champion, but chose not to participate.

Storm Sanders won the title, defeating Lizette Cabrera in an all-Australian final, 6–3, 6–4.

Seeds

Draw

Finals

Top half

Bottom half

References

External Links
Main Draw

City of Playford Tennis International II - Singles